Shahed Aviation Industries Research Center (مرکز تحقیقات صنایع هوایی شاهد) is an Iranian aerospace company known for designing military helicopters and UAVs. They are associated with the Islamic Revolutionary Guard Corps Aerospace Force (IRGC-ASF) and the Iran Aircraft Manufacturing Industries Corporation (HESA).

Products

Helicopters
HESA Shahed 274
HESA Shahed 278
HESA Shahed 285

Drones
 Shahed 121
 Shahed 123
 Shahed 125
Shahed 129
Shahed 131
HESA Shahed 136
 Shahed 141
Shahed 149 Gaza
 Shahed 161
Shahed Saegheh-1
Shahed 171 Simorgh
 Shahed 191 (Saegheh-2)
 Shahed 197

Legal
On 20 October 2022, the European Union imposed sanctions against Shahed Aviation Industries, claiming the company is providing drones to Russian troops in Ukraine. Russia does not confirm using Iranian UAVs.

In November 2022, Shahed Aviation was also sactioned by the USA and Canada.

References

Defence companies of Iran
Aerospace companies of Iran